Samakalin was a progressive Assamese magazine published from Guwahati in the 1960s. It played a vital role in the socio-political lives of the people of Assam and a platform for new writers to express their views. The magazine was published by Pabitra Kumar Deka, Amal Barua and Gobinda Chandra Gogoi, all employees of Assam Tribune group of newspapers. 

The Editors of the magazine were Amulya Barua and the famous Novelist Padma Borkotoki. Many eminent writers like Kirtinath Hazarika, Hiren Gohain, Lakshmi Nandan Bora, Nirode Choudhury, Rabindra Sarkar, Kamal Gogoi and Saurabh Kumar Chaliha were regular contributors to the journal.
A theater club was also opened under the Samakalin group known as Samakalin Natya Gosthi and plays like Surjyahara (Gauri Barman) and Putolar Namaskar (Atul Bordoloi) were staged in the late sixties.

References

Assamese-language mass media
Assamese literature
Monthly magazines published in India